Belgium at the UCI Cyclo-cross World Championships is an overview of the Belgian results at the UCI Cyclo-cross World Championships. The only times that cyclo-cross racers appear in proper national selections of one or multiple sportsmen are the yearly UCI Cyclo-cross World Championships. Because of this, all Belgian national cyclo-cross teams (either elite or younger teams) only compete as such during one day per year. Since 2017, Belgium's national manager of the men's elite selection is Sven Vanthourenhout.

As of 30 January 2022, Belgium obtained most gold medals in the men's elite race and the men's races for under-23. Belgium's most successful competitor in elite races was Eric De Vlaeminck, with 7 gold medals. The nation's first medal, a silver, was earned by Firmin Van Kerrebroeck in the men's elite race in 1957.

List of medalists 
This a list of all Belgian medals (including elite, under-23 and junior races).

Medals by discipline

References 

UCI Cyclo-cross World Championships